Karnataka Kranti Ranga (Karnataka Revolutionary Front), also known as the Kannada Kranti Ranga was a regional political party in Karnataka, India. KKR was formed by Devaraj Urs in 1979, as a split from the Indian National Congress. It subsequently became part of what was called the Congress (Urs) and finally merged with the Janata Party.

In 1983, KKR was "floated" by Sarekoppa Bangarappa, but merged with Congress before the 1989 Karnataka Assembly elections.

References

Defunct political parties in Karnataka
Political parties established in 1979
1979 establishments in Karnataka
Political parties disestablished in 1990
1990 disestablishments in India